Franz Josef von Hallwyl, born 1719 in from Solothurn, son of lieutenant-colonel Abraham Gabriel von Hallwyl and Anna Franziska de Tayac, dead 1785 in Colmar, France, was a Swiss officer, marechal de camp in  French service, colonel-proprietor of the Swiss regiment de Karrer. He married Marie Therese de Mydorge in 1757. Hallwyl was rewarded multiple times; becoming a knight of the Order of Saint Louis in 1745 for meritorious service in the battle of Fontenoy, a knight of the Polish Order of the White Eagle 1777, and a French count.

Military career
In 1733 Hallwyl became a cadet in the French regiment of horse, Royal Piemont; promoted to ensign in the Gardes Suisses 1740 he participated in the War of the Austrian Succession in Italy, Flanders, and Germany. Becoming colonel-proprietor of the Régiment de Karrer in 1752, which henceforth was known under the name de Hallwyl, he remained with the colonel's company at the depot in Rochefort while the rest of the regiment was stationed overseas. When his regiment was disbanded in 1763 he received an annual pension of 20,000 livres from the French Crown. Hallwyl was commandant of Colmar from 1782 until his death.

References

1719 births
1785 deaths
People from Solothurn
French military personnel of the War of the Austrian Succession
Swiss mercenaries
Knights of the Order of Saint Louis
Counts of France